The 1923 New South Wales Rugby Football League premiership was the sixteenth season of Sydney’s top-level rugby league club competition, Australia’s first. Nine teams from across the city contested during the season which culminated in Eastern Suburbs’ victory over South Sydney in the premiership final. This season would be the last season that future Australian Rugby League Hall of Fame inductee Duncan Thompson played in, for he returned to Toowoomba after a dispute with North Sydney.

Teams
 Balmain, formed on 23 January 1908 at Balmain Town Hall
 Eastern Suburbs, formed on 24 January 1908 at Paddington Town Hall
 Glebe, formed on 9 January 1908
 Newtown, formed on 14 January 1908
 North Sydney, formed at the North Sydney School of Arts in Mount Street on 7 February 1908. 
 South Sydney, formed on 17 January 1908 at Redfern Town Hall
 St. George, formed on 8 November 1920 at Kogarah School of Arts
 Western Suburbs, formed on 4 February 1908
 University, formed in 1919 at Sydney University

Ladder

Finals
The top two sides, Eastern Suburbs and South Sydney, tied on equal points at the end of the season. Eastern Suburbs had previously been leading South Sydney by two premiership points coming into the final round of the year, only to lose to third-placed Balmain by one point in front of 14,000 people in their final match. South Sydney on the other hand won their final match against North Sydney to finish level on top of the ladder.

Premiership final

A final, the second in as many seasons, was played between Eastern Suburbs and South Sydney the following Wednesday 12 September at the Sydney Cricket Ground, attracting a crowd of 15,000 people. With referee Tom McMahon officiating Eastern Suburbs prevailed winners 15–12 and claimed their first premiership since 1913.

Eastern Suburbs 15 (Tries:  Caples 2,  Steel. Goals: Oxford 3)

South Sydney 12 (Tries:  Wearing 2. Goals: Wearing 3)

References

External links
 Rugby League Tables - Notes AFL Tables
 Rugby League Tables - Season 1923 AFL Tables
 Premiership History and Statistics RL1908
 History - Introduction North Sydney Bears
 Hadden, Brad  History of the NSWRL Finals
Results: 1921-30 at rabbitohs.com.au

New South Wales Rugby League premiership
NSWRFL season